The Le Mars Blackbirds were a minor league baseball team based in Le Mars, Iowa. In 1902 and 1903, the Blackbirds played as members of the Class D level Iowa-South Dakota League, capturing the 1903 league championship. 

Baseball Hall of Fame member Branch Rickey played for the 1903 Le Mars Blackbirds.

History
The Le Mars Blackbirds became charter members of the six–team Iowa-South Dakota League in 1902. The Iowa-South Dakota League was a Class D level League. The President of the Iowa–South Dakota League was J.U. Sammis, an attorney who practiced and resided in Le Mars. In their first season, the Blackbirds finished with a record of 43–48. Le Mars placed fourth in the Iowa–South Dakota League standings, playing the season under managers Bobby Alberts and Bob Black. Black was a resident of Le Mars and owned a local bowling alley. A retired major league player, Black was recruited to become the manager after being spotted watching an early game from the stands. In 1902, Grandstand seats were .25 cents for Le Mars games.

The 1902 Iowa–South Dakota League standings featured the Flandreau Indians (51–19), Le Mars Blackbirds (43–48), Rock Rapids Browns 39–52, Sheldon (14–71), Sioux City Cornhuskers (56–40) and the champion Sioux Falls Canaries (65–24).

Baseball Hall of Fame member Branch Rickey played for the Le Mars Blackbirds in 1903.  In June 1903, manager Bob Black signed Rickey, an Ohio native to a contract for $150 per month. A noted manager and baseball executive after his playing career, Rickey was best known for famously signing Jackie Robinson to the Brooklyn Dodgers while serving as Brooklyn's General Manager. A Methodist, Rickey reportedly didn't play in games on Sunday. Rickey hit .265 in 41 games for Le Mars as a catcher.

In 1903, the president of the Iowa-South Dakota League was again J. U. Sammism,  a Le Mars attorney.

In a July 1903 game, an umpire named "Lally" ejected Le Mars manager Bobby Black from a game and also fined him $5.00 for his actions.

With Branch Rickey on the roster, the 1903 Le Mars Blackbirds won the Iowa–South Dakota League Championship. In what proved to be the final season for the Iowa–South Dakota League, the Blackbirds finished the season with a 48–34 record. Their record was placed them first in the Iowa–South Dakota League under returning manager Bob Black, with Le Mars finishing 2.5 games ahead of the second place Council Bluffs Bluffers/Sheldon-Primghar Hyphens.
No playoffs were held. The Iowa–South Dakota League permanently folded after the 1903 season.

After the 1903 season, each member of the 1903 Le Mars Championship team received a gold medal inscribed with "ISD Pennant Winners," the player's name and the date.

Le Mars has not hosted another minor league team.

Ballparks
The name of the Le Mars Blackbirds' home minor league ballpark is not directly referenced. Riverview Park and West Floyd Park were both in use during the era. Both parks still host baseball today in Le Mars, Iowa.

Timeline

Year–by–year records

Notable alumni

Baseball Hall of Fame alumni
Branch Rickey (1903) Inducted, 1967

Notable alumni
Bob Black (1902–1903, MGR)
George Bristow (1902)
Jim Buchanan (1902)
Pete Lister (1902)
Peaches O'Neill (1902)

See also
Le Mars Blackbirds players

References

External links
Le Mars - Baseball Reference

Defunct minor league baseball teams
Professional baseball teams in Iowa
Defunct baseball teams in Iowa
Baseball teams established in 1902
Baseball teams disestablished in 1903
Le Mars, Iowa
Plymouth County, Iowa
Iowa-South Dakota League teams
1902 establishments in Iowa
1903 disestablishments in Iowa